The 1946–47 BAA season was the first season for the St. Louis Bombers in the BAA (which later became the NBA).

Roster

Regular season

Season standings

Record vs. opponents

Game log

Playoffs

|- style="background:#fcc;"
| 1
| April 2
| @ Philadelphia
| 68–73
| George Munroe & Johnny Logan (16)
| 
| 
| Philadelphia Arena
| 0–1
|- style="background:#cfc;"
| 2
| April 5
| Philadelphia
| 73–51
| Belus Smawley (17)
| 
| 
| St. Louis Arena
| 1–1
|- style="background:#fcc;"
| 3
| April 6
| Philadelphia
| 59–75
| Belus Smawley (21)
| 
|
| St. Louis Arena
| 1–2

References

St. Louis Bombers (NBA) seasons
St. Louis